Commission Regulation (EU) No. 1170/2011 of 16 November 2011 refusing to authorise certain health claims made on foods and referring to the reduction of disease risk is a European Union regulation addressing permissible nutritional and health claims made on foods sold in the EU. It includes two opinions:
 It prohibits food business operators from claiming that "regular consumption of significant amounts of water can reduce the risk of development of dehydration and of concomitant decrease of performance."
 It prohibits the claim that consumption of calcium-containing fruit juices can reduce the risk of dental erosion.

References
"EU bans claim that water can prevent dehydration", The Daily Telegraph, 18 November 2011
"Why the EU made its common sense defying decision", The Daily Telegraph, 21 November 2011

2011 in law
2011 in the European Union
1170 2011
1170/2011